Edith Lyttleton or Lyttelton may refer to:

 Edith Joan Lyttleton (1873–1945), Australasian author
 Dame Edith Balfour Lyttelton (1865–1948), British novelist, World War I-era activist and spiritualist